The 2015 Abierto Tampico was a professional tennis tournament played on outdoor hard courts. It was the third edition of the tournament and part of the 2015 ITF Women's Circuit, offering a total of $50,000+H in prize money. It took place in Tampico, Mexico, on 5–11 October 2015.

Singles main draw entrants

Seeds 

 1 Rankings as of 28 September 2015

Other entrants 
The following players received wildcards into the singles main draw:
  Nadia Podoroska
  Ana Sofía Sánchez
  Aleksandra Wozniak
  Renata Zarazúa

The following players received entry from the qualifying draw:
  Tadeja Majerič
  Alice Matteucci
  Tara Moore
  Conny Perrin

The following player received entry by a lucky loser spot:
  Martina Caregaro

Champions

Singles

 Lourdes Domínguez Lino def.  Alizé Lim, 7–5, 6–4

Doubles

 María Irigoyen /  Barbora Krejčíková def.  Verónica Cepede Royg /  Marina Melnikova, 7–5, 6–2

External links 
 2015 Abierto Tampico at ITFtennis.com
  

2015 ITF Women's Circuit
Alberto
2015 in Mexican tennis